Jauharabad-Ii is one of the 51 Union Councils (administrative subdivisions) of Khushab District in the Punjab Province of Pakistan.

References

Union councils of Khushab District
Populated places in Khushab District
Nuclear history of Pakistan